The Official Secrets Act 1972 (abbreviated OSA), is a statute in Malaysia prohibiting the dissemination of information classified as an official secret. The legislation is based on the Official Secrets Act of the United Kingdom. After criticism of the act for lacking clarity, it was amended in 1986.

Provisions

The act defines an "official secret" as:

The Schedule to the Act covers "Cabinet documents, records of decisions and deliberations including those of Cabinet committees", as well as similar documents for state executive councils. It also includes "documents concerning national security, defence and international relations".

Criticism
The act has been criticised for ostensibly stifling dissent and reducing transparency in government workings. One statesman has suggested that the act has turned the press into "an alternative Government Gazette". In addition, the usage of the act to classify documents which "cannot by any stretch of the imagination be reasonably confidential or secret" has been criticised.

Structure
The Official Secrets Act 1972, in its current form (1 January 2006), consists of 31 sections and 1 schedule (including 9 amendments), without separate Part.
 Section 1: Short title
 Section 2: Interpretation
 Section 2A: Addition, deletion or amendment of the Schedule
 Section 2B: Appointment of public officer to classify official document, etc.
 Section 2C: Declassification of official secret by a Minister or a public officer
 Section 3: Penalties for spying
 Section 4: Prohibition of taking or making any document, measurement, sounding or survey of or within a prohibited place
 Section 5: Penalty for making or assisting in making false declarations or statements in obtaining permits
 Section 6: Special power of the court to direct search and seizure
 Section 7: Prohibition from carrying photographic apparatus
 Section 7A: Duty to report request for information, etc.
 Section 7B: Placing in confidence of foreign agent
 Section 8: Wrongful communication, etc. of official secret
 Section 9: Unauthorized use of uniforms, falsification of reports, forgery, personation and false documents
 Section 10: Interfering with police officers or members of the armed forces
 Section 11: Duty to give information
 Section 12: Power to require the production of messages
 Section 13: Harbouring
 Section 14: Attempts, incitements, etc.
 Section 15: Restrictions on prosecutions
 Section 16: Burden of proof and presumptions
 Section 16A: Certificate by a public officer to be conclusive evidence
 Section 17: Communications with foreign agents to be evidence of commission of certain offences
 Section 17A: Defence available to a public officer
 Section 18: Power to arrest
 Section 19: Powers of search and seizure
 Section 20: Special powers of investigation
 Section 21: Admission of statements in evidence
 Section 22: Evidence of accomplice
 Section 23: Examination of offenders
 Section 24: Protection of informers
 Section 25: Liability for offences outside Malaysia
 Section 26: Trial of offences
 Section 27: Exclusion of public during proceedings
 Section 28: Criminal liability of corporation or firm
 Section 29: Minister may confer police powers on suitable persons
 Section 30: Powers under Criminal Procedure Code not restricted
 Section 30A: Regulations
 Section 31: Repeal
 Schedule

See also
 Official Secrets Act

References

External links
 Official Secrets Act 1972 

1972 in Malaysian law
Malaysian federal legislation
Classified information